Hylla is a village in the municipality of Inderøy in Trøndelag county, Norway. The village is home to a large limestone quarry and processing facility.

References

Villages in Trøndelag
Inderøy